Party in My Head may refer to:
 Party in My Head (Miss Kittin & The Hacker song)
 Party in My Head (September song)
 Party in My Head, a song by Sophie Ellis-Bextor, from the album  Shoot from the Hip